Andreas Beck and Jan Mertl are the defending champions, but chose not to defend their title .

Ken Skupski and Neal Skupski won the title, defeating Yoshihito Nishioka and Aldin Setkic in the final 4–6, 6–3, [10–6] .

Seeds

Draw

References
 Main Draw

Challenger La Manche - Doubles